Mạc Thiên Tứ (1700–1780), also known as Mạc Thiên Tích or Mạc Tông, was a Vietnamese leader who ruled Hà Tiên from 1736 to 1777. He was called Mo Shilin in Veritable Records of Qing dynasty.

He was the eldest son of Mạc Cửu, and born to a Vietnamese woman from Biên Hòa. He also had a sister, Mac Kim Dinh, who was married to the son of the Chinese general Trần Thượng Xuyên. After his father's death, he received the title of Tổng binh of Hà Tiên and the noble title Marquess Tông Đức (Vietnamese: Tông Đức hầu) from Nguyễn lord. His reign saw the golden age of Hà Tiên. Bureaucracy was set up, military was increased, castles and business streets were built. Hà Tiên became the trade center in Mekong Delta; it became the best-known port in the Gulf of Siam long before the founding of Saigon and Bangkok. In his 1742 letter to Japanese Tokugawa shogunate in Khmer, he called himself Reachea Krong Kampucea Tiptei ("king of Cambodia") and later Neak Somdec Preah Sotoat. However, Siamese sources called him both Ong Chien Chun ("Chinese general") and Phraya Rachasethi, thus confusing him with Oknya Reachea Sedthei, the Khmer governor of Banteay Meas.

Mạc Thiên Tứ was also interested in Chinese culture, and built many schools. He adopted a policy of religious tolerance, he treated all religions evenhandedly. Pierre Pigneau de Behaine, a French Catholic priest, was allowed to preach in Hà Tiên.

According to Vietnamese source, in 1739, a Cambodian army led by "Nặc Bồn" invaded Hà Tiên, but was utterly defeated by Tứ. From then on, Cambodia did not try to resume Hà Tiên. Though no Cambodian chronicle recorded this affair, Tứ's victory was highly significant since it allowed Hà Tiên to enjoy full independence from Cambodia thereafter.

In 1756, the Cambodian king Chey Chettha VII (Nặc Ong Nguyên) died. Thommo Reachea IV (Nặc Ông Yếm) succeeded the throne, but soon was murdered and usurped by Ang Hing (Nặc Hinh). A Cambodian prince, Ang Ton (Nặc Ông Tôn), fled to Hà Tiên. In there, Ang Ton became Mạc Thiên Tứ's adopted son. Tứ escorted Ang Ton back to Cambodia, and crowned him the new king as Outey II. In return, Outey ceded Hương Úc (mordern Sihanoukville), Cần Bột (Kampot), Trực Sâm (Chhouk), Sài Mạt (Banteay Meas) and Linh Quỳnh (Kiri Vong) to Hà Tiên.

After War of the second fall of Ayutthaya, Mạc Thiên Tứ hid Siamese prince Chao Chui (Chiêu Thúy). Chao Chui was a son of Prince Aphai, and also a grandson of king Thai Sa. After Taksin crowned the new king of Siam, Chao Chui was regarded as a big threat by Taksin. Taksin tried to persuade Mạc Thiên Tứ to hand over Chao Chui, but was rejected. Instead, Tứ tried to install Chao Chui as the new Siamese king. In 1769, a Hà Tiên navy under Trần Hầu (Trần Đại Lực) was sent to attack Chantaburi. Taksin appointed Chiam (Tang Lieng or Trần Liên, Khun Phiphit Wathi), a Teochiu chief of the Chinese junk fleet, as the new vice-governor of Trat with the title Phraya Phiphit. Hà Tiên navy was defeated by Phraya Phiphit, and had to retreat.

Another incident increased the contradictions between Mạc Thiên Tứ and Taksin. After the defeat of Konbaung Burma, Taksin sent a tributary mission in Canton to require the royal seal, claiming that the throne of Ayutthaya Kingdom had come to an end. However, Tứ reported to Chinese mandarins that Taksin was a usurper. Qianlong rejected Taksin's request, and ordered Taksin to install Prince Chao Chui. Taksin was getting more and more irritated at Tứ's actions.

In 1771, Siamese army led by Taksin and Phraya Phiphit landed at Kampong Som (present-day Sihanoukville) and Kampot, then besieged and captured Hà Tiên. Tứ had to flee to Gia Định (modern Ho Chi Minh City) and seek refuge for Nguyễn lord. Taksin appointed Tang Lieng as the governor of Hà Tiên. Two years later, with the help of Nguyễn lord, Tứ returned to Hà Tiên.

In 1775, Nguyễn Phúc Thuần was defeated by Tây Sơn army and fled south. Tứ led troops to support him. Thuần was captured and executed by Tây Sơn rebel general Nguyễn Huệ in 1777. Huệ tried to persuade him to surrender, but was rejected. Tứ fled to Phú Quốc then to Siam. Tôn Thất Xuân, a mandarin of Nguyễn lord, also fled to Siam for support. In Thonburi, they were warmly welcome by King Taksin. Taksin also asked Tứ to bury their past misunderstandings. Tứ was awarded the Siamese rank and title Phraya Rachasethi Yuan (lit. "Phraya Rachasethi the Vietnamese"), using the word "Yuan" to distinguish with the former governor Tang Lieng (Phraya Rachasethi Chin).

Nguyễn Ánh ascended the lord throne in 1780. Ánh sent envoys to Siam in order to seek alliance with Siam. In the same time, a Siamese merchant ship was looted by Đỗ Thanh Nhơn, an important military commander of Nguyễn lord. According to Vietnamese records, taking this opportunity, Nguyễn Huệ forged a letter from Ánh to Tứ, and sent it to Taksin. In the letter, Ánh planned to raid Thonburi, and ordered Tứ and Tôn Thất Xuân to help him on the inside. Taksin was taken in, and threw Mạc Thiên Tứ into prison. However, Thai record stated that Mạc Thiên Tứ planned to flee back to Hà Tiên, but was exposed, so Taksin arrested him.

Tứ committed suicide in prison. Two sons, Mạc Tử Hoàng and Mạc Tử Dung, his wife, Tôn Thất Xuân and the Vietnamese envoys were executed. His three sons, Mạc Tử Sanh, Mạc Tử Tuấn and Mạc Tử Thiêm, were rescued by Kalahom (Pok) and hid in countryside. After King Rama I ascended the Siamese throne, they were allowed to live in Bangkok. Later, Sinh became new ruler of Hà Tiên. In 1789, Mạc Công Bính, a son of Mạc Tử Hoàng, brought his body back to Vietnam, and buried in Hà Tiên.

Family
Mạc Thiên Tứ had a large number of offsprings, including:

Sons:
 Mạc Tử Hoàng (鄚子潢),  heir apparent, born to principal wife Nguyễn Thị
 Mạc Tử Dung (鄚子溶) or Mạc Tử Duyên (鄚子沿), born to principal wife Nguyễn Thị
 Mạc Tử Thảng (鄚子淌), born to principal wife Nguyễn Thị
 Mạc Tử Sanh (鄚子泩), born to a concubine
 Mạc Tử Tuấn (鄚子浚), born to a concubine
 Mạc Tử Thiêm (鄚子添), born to a concubine
Daughters:
 Mạc Thị Long (鄚氏隆), born to principal wife Nguyễn Thị
 Mạc Thị Hai (鄚氏咍), born to principal wife Nguyễn Thị
 Mạc Thị Giác (鄚氏灚), born to principal wife Nguyễn Thị

Notes

Sources

1700 births
1780 deaths
Hoa people
Minh Hương
Rulers of Hà Tiên